Metro 2033 may refer to:
 Metro 2033 (novel), a 2002 novel by Russian author Dmitry Glukhovsky
 Metro 2033 (video game), a 2010 first-person shooter video game based on the novel

See also
 Metro (franchise), originating from the 2005 novel